Sir Austen Patrick Brown, KCB (born 1940), commonly known as Patrick Brown, is a retired British civil servant and businessman.

Born in 1940, Brown attended the School of Slavonic and East European Studies in London. He worked in the private sector, in Carreras Ltd from 1961 to 1969 and then as a management consultant with Urwick Orr and Partners from 1969 to 1972; in both roles, he worked extensively in Europe. In 1972, he entered HM Civil Service, becoming a Deputy Secretary in the Department of the Environment (DoE) in 1988. He was then Second Permanent Secretary in the DoE and Chief Executive of the Property Services Agency from 1990 to 1991 and then Permanent Secretary of the Department of Transport from 1991 to 1997. He subsequently held various directorships in the private sector and was chairman of the Go-Ahead Group Plc from 2002 to 2013. He also served as chairman of the Oil and Gas Authority from 2015 to 2018. Brown was appointed a Knight Companion of the Order of the Bath (KCB) in the 1995 New Year honours.

References 

Living people
1940 births
British civil servants
British businesspeople
Alumni of the University of London
Knights Companion of the Order of the Bath
Civil servants in the Property Services Agency